Astra 2E is one of the Astra communications satellites owned and operated by SES S.A., launched to the Astra 28.2°E orbital position on 30 September 2013  after a 10-week delay caused by launcher problems. The satellite provides free-to-air and encrypted direct-to-home (DTH) digital television and satellite broadband services for Europe and the Middle East.

After launch, Astra 2E underwent in-orbit testing at 43.5° East  and began commercial operations at 28.2° East in February 2014. At that time, channels broadcast via Astra 1N (temporarily located at 28.2° East pending Astra 1E's launch) were transferred to Astra 2E and Astra 1N relocated to its design position at 19.2° East.

Astra 2E is the second of three "second generation" satellites for the 28.2° East position to replace the first generation Astra 2A, Astra 2B, Astra 2C and Astra 2D craft originally positioned  there between 1998 and 2001. The first, Astra 2F, was launched in 2012, and the third, Astra 2G, was launched on 27 December 2014.)

Unlike other SES/Astra satellites, the launch order of Astra 2E and Astra 2F is not reflected in their alphabetical names, with Astra 2F launched 10 months before Astra 2E.

Market 
The Astra 28.2° East orbital position was established in 1998 to provide digital television, digital radio and multimedia services to the United Kingdom and Ireland, and Astra 2E's primary mission is to continue this provision as replacement and follow-on capacity to the Astra 2A, Astra 2D and Astra 1N satellites. Along with Astra 2F it delivers programming to almost 13 million satellite homes, over 3 million cable homes, and 700,000 Internet Protocol television (IPTV) homes in the United Kingdom and Ireland, in particular for channels from the major United Kingdom digital satellite television satellite bus, BSkyB and Freesat.

ASTRA 2E also delivers broadcast and Very-small-aperture terminal (VSAT) services in Europe, Middle East and Africa in Ku-band. and Ka-band capacity will provide internet via satellite with download speeds of up to 20 Mbit/s to Germany.

Broadcasting footprint 
Astra 2E has three Ku-band downlink beams covering Europe and the Middle East:
 The European Beam is centred on the English Channel with maximum signal over the United Kingdom, Ireland, France, Benelux, and parts of Germany, Austria, and Spain (including a "lobe" specifically designed to serve the Canary Islands), and reception on a larger dish extending to Italy, Poland, North Africa, and the Balkans.
 The UK Beam provides maximum signal (for 45 cm dishes) over the United Kingdom, Ireland, Benelux and Northern France with a sharp roll-off of signal level outside this region, in close approximation of the UK Beam of Astra 2D. This enables channels to be broadcast free-to-air but with reception effectively constrained to the British Isles, and has been the basis for the Freesat free-to-air United Kingdom platform.
 The Middle East beam is centred on the Arabian Peninsula and extends to Turkey and into East Africa, to provide for reception with 50 cm dishes.

The Ka-band footprint for satellite broadband provides full service coverage centred on central Europe and extending to France, Italy, the Balkans, the United Kingdom, and southern Sweden and Norway.

The satellite is fitted with 60 Ku-band transponders.

Launch delay 
The launch of Astra 2E was intended to be by International Launch Services (ILS) Proton-M launch vehicle on 21 July 2013, but the previous launch of this launch vehicle on 2 July 2013, carrying three Russian GLONASS navigation satellites, ended with the exploding shortly after lift off and the Proton launch programme was postponed. The fault with the failed rocket was found to be the incorrect installation of three angular rate sensors, Roscosmos reported, and the launch programme was recommenced in September 2013.

Television channels on Astra 2E 
Below is a list, of the TV channels broadcast from Astra 2E on its UK Beam and European Beam (the UK Beam is the most difficult to receive outside Britain and its islands):

See also 

 2013 in spaceflight
 SES (satellite operator)
 Astra (satellite family)
 Astra 28.2°E (orbital position)
 Astra 2F (co-located satellite)
 Astra 2G (co-located satellite)

References

External links 
 SES fleet information and map
 Official SES site

Astra satellites
Communications satellites in geostationary orbit
Spacecraft launched in 2013
2013 in Luxembourg
Satellites of Luxembourg
Satellites using the Eurostar bus